Wolf Butte Township is a township in Adams County, North Dakota, United States. As of the 2010 census, its population was 25. Lewis O. Richardson, longtime North Dakota legislator, is buried here.

References

Townships in Adams County, North Dakota
Townships in North Dakota